The 1897 WAFA season was the 13th season of senior Australian rules football in Perth, Western Australia. West Perth won the premiership, their first, after remaining undefeated throughout the season. The Rovers team finished last and failed to field a team for the final rounds of the season, forfeiting several matches to their opponents. 1897 was also the final season that Imperials competed, when at the end of the season it was discovered that “many of the bills were unpaid and that creditors were clamorous”.

Clubs

Home-and-away season
In 1897, the WAFA competition consisted of four teams of 20 on-the-field players each with only two venues, the WACA Ground and Fremantle Oval being used to host matches. This season also saw the introduction of the rule stipulating that a mark could only be made at the distance of ten yards or more, leading to a more open game.

When reporting match scores in 1897, the number of goals and behinds scored by each team is given; however, only the number of goals scored is considered when determining the result of a match. This was the final WAFA season before the introduction of the modern system of scoring, in which six points is awarded for a goal and one point is awarded for a behind.

Round 1

Round 2

Round 3

Round 4

Round 5

Representative Game

Round 6

Round 7

Round 8

Round 9

Round 10

Round 11

Round 12

Round 13

Round 14

Round 15

Round 16

Ladder

References

West Australian Football League seasons
WAFL